David Bielkheden (born June 6, 1979) is a retired Swedish mixed martial artist who competed in the Welterweight division. A professional competitor since 2001, he has competed for the UFC, PRIDE Fighting Championships, Shooto, Cage Rage, M-1 Global, and Cage Warriors.

Mixed martial arts career
Bielkheden went 1-2 in UFC and was released from the UFC following his submission loss (rear-naked choke) to Mark Bocek at UFC 97 and has since held a record of 13-5. Right now is Bielkheden riding a 9 fight win streak.

Superior Challenge
On October 29, 2010 Bielkheden fought Daniel Acácio for the Superior Challenge Welterweight Championship at Superior Challenge 6. He lost the fight via split decision. Bielkheden later failed his post fight drug test following the defeat and was given a 2-year suspension by the Doping Tribunal on April 29, 2011. Additionally, Bielkheden’s loss was changed to a disqualification. Bielkheden initially tested positive for methylhexaneamine, a stimulant often used as a nasal decongestant. The fighter found out about his positive test by mail when he returned from a trip from Canada shortly after the bout. He then paid out of pocket to have his “B” sample tested in hopes that a different result would be found. That was not the case, as Bielkheden found out in December 2010 that his second screen was also flagged for the banned substance, which was added to the World Anti-Doping Agency's prohibited list in 2009. Bielkheden called it a case of “accidental doping” and has pointed to a nasal spray he took a few weeks prior to the bout or food supplements as the probable cause of this substance showing up in tests. In a statement to his fans on his blog, Bielkheden asserts that he had cooperated with the Swedish Doping Tribunal and had been given the go-ahead to fight at Superior Challenge 7 on three separate occasions. Bielkheden was reportedly told the tribunal would hand down judgment for his positive test during the first week of May. However, his punishment was delivered a bit sooner than expected. "The punishment I have been awarded is far too long,” he wrote. “I will spend all my energy, time and money to contest this decision and get this sentence shortened.”

Championships and accomplishments

Mixed martial arts
Superior Challenge
SC Welterweight Championship (One time)
Two successful title defenses
Scandinavian Fight Nights
SFN Welterweight Championship (One time; first; current)
Shooto Sweden
Shooto Sweden Welterweight Championship (One time)

Submission grappling
1999 European cup 3rd place
1999 France Open debutant winner
1999 France Open advanced  2nd place
1999 Krugan Cup  2nd place
2000 Iron Man UK winner
2000 Finnish Open 3rd place
2001 Kaisho Cup 2 winner
2001 BadBoy Cup winner
2001 Grapplers Paradise winner
2001 Kaisho Cup 4  3rd place
2002 Fighter Extreme 1  winner
2002 Finnish Open winner
2002 Finnish Open BJJ winner
2003 ADCC European Trials 3rd place
2003 Pan American purplebelt class winner
2003 Exhale BJJ purplebelt open class winner
2003 Finnish Open winner
2004 Gameness 2nd place
2004 Submission Wrestling Superfight Winner
2004 ADCC Dutch Open Winner
2007 SFG Submission Wrestling Tournament winner
2010 Swedish National Submission Wrestling Championship
2012 Swedish National Submission Wrestling Championship

Mixed martial arts record 

|- 
|Loss
|align=center|26–13
|Patrik Pietilä
|Decision (unanimous)
|Superior Challenge 19
|
|align=center|3
|align=center|5:00
|Stockholm, Sweden 
|Non-title bout.
|- 
|Win
|align=center|26–12
|Marcin Bandel
|Decision (unanimous)
|Superior Challenge 18
|
|align=center|3
|align=center|5:00
|Stockholm, Sweden
| Defended SC Welterweight Championship.
|-
| Win
| align=center| 25–12
| Anton Radman
| TKO (punches)
| Superior Challenge 16
| 
| align=center| 1
| align=center| 4:20
| Stockholm, Sweden
| Defended SC Welterweight Championship.
|-
| Win
| align=center| 24–12
| Morten Djursaa
| Decision (unanimous)
| Superior Challenge 15
| 
| align=center| 3
| align=center| 5:00
| Stockholm, Sweden
| Won SC Welterweight Championship.
|-
| Win
| align=center| 23–12
| Luis Ramos
| TKO (punches)
| Superior Challenge 14
| 
| align=center| 3
| align=center| 2:13
| Stockholm, Sweden
| 
|-
| Win
| align=center| 22–12
| Adrian Grec
| TKO (punches)
| Scandinavian Fight Nights 1
| 
| align=center| 1
| align=center| N/A
| Solna, Sweden
| Won SFN Welterweight Championship.
|-
| Win
| align=center| 21–12
| Cody McKenzie
| Decision (unanimous)
| Superior Challenge 12
| 
| align=center| 3
| align=center| 5:00
| Malmö, Sweden
|
|-
| Win
| align=center| 20–12
| Florent Betorangal
| Submission (kneebar)
| Superior Challenge 11
| 
| align=center| 2
| align=center| 4:59
| Södertälje, Sweden
|
|-
| Win
| align=center| 19–12
| Besam Yousef
| Decision (unanimous)
| Superior Challenge 10
| 
| align=center| 3
| align=center| 5:00
| Helsingborg, Sweden
|
|-
| Win
| align=center| 18–12
| Diego Gonzalez
| Decision (unanimous)
| Golden Ring: Wallberg vs Prazak
| 
| align=center| 3
| align=center| 5:00
| Stockholm, Sweden
|
|-
| Loss
| align=center| 17–12
| Marcus Davis
| Decision (unanimous)
| Superior Challenge 8
| 
| align=center| 3
| align=center| 5:00
| Malmö, Sweden
|
|-
| Loss
| align=center| 17–11
| Cathal Pendred
| Decision (unanimous)
| Cage Warriors: 47
| 
| align=center| 3
| align=center| 5:00
| Dublin, Ireland
|
|-
| Win
| align=center| 17–10
| Edgar Dayan
| TKO (punches)
| MMA Against Dengue 2
| 
| align=center| 1
| align=center| 1:19
| Rio de Janeiro, Brazil
|
|-
| Loss
| align=center| 16–10
| Flavio Alvaro
| Decision (split)
| MMA Against Dengue
| 
| align=center| 3
| align=center| 5:00
| Rio de Janeiro, Brazil
|
|-
| Loss
| align=center| 16–9
| Daniel Acácio
| DQ (overturned)
| Superior Challenge 6
| 
| align=center| 3
| align=center| 5:00
| Stockholm, Sweden
| For SC Welterweight Championship; Originally split decision loss, overturned since Bielkheden tested positive for banned substances.
|-
| Loss
| align=center| 16–8
| Tommy Depret
| Submission (guillotine choke)
| United Glory 12
| 
| align=center| 1
| align=center| 0:36
| Amsterdam, Netherlands
| Return to Welterweight; UG Welterweight Tournament Quarterfinal bout.
|-
| Win
| align=center| 16–7
| Musa Khamanaev
| TKO (punches)
| M-1 Selection 2010: Western Europe Round 3
| 
| align=center| 2
| align=center| 1:57
| Helsinki, Finland
|
|-
| Win
| align=center| 15–7
| Ville Räsänen
| TKO (punches)
| Helsinki Fight Night
| 
| align=center| 1
| align=center| 3:06
| Helsinki, Finland
|
|-
| Win
| align=center| 14–7
| Ufuk Isgusarer
| Decision (unanimous)
| Upcoming Glory 5
| 
| align=center| 5
| align=center| 5:00
| Deventer, Netherlands
|
|-
| Loss
| align=center| 13–7
| Mark Bocek
| Submission (rear-naked choke)
| UFC 97
| 
| align=center| 1
| align=center| 4:57
| Montreal, Quebec, Canada
|
|-
| Win
| align=center| 13–6
| Jess Liaudin
| Decision (unanimous)
| UFC 89
| 
| align=center| 3
| align=center| 5:00
| Birmingham, England
| Lightweight debut.
|-
| Loss
| align=center| 12–6
| Diego Sanchez
| TKO (submission to punches)
| UFC 82
| 
| align=center| 1
| align=center| 4:43
| Columbus, Ohio, United States
|
|-
| Win
| align=center| 12–5
| Nikola Matic
| TKO
| Lord of the Ring: Schilt vs. Guelmino
| 
| align=center| 1
| align=center| N/A
| Belgrade, Serbia
|
|-
| Win
| align=center| 11–5
| Lubormir Roumenov
| Decision (unanimous)
| FinnFight 9
| 
| align=center| 2
| align=center| N/A
| Turku, Finland
|
|-
| Loss
| align=center| 10–5
| Mitsuhiro Ishida
| Decision (unanimous)
| PRIDE: Bushido 13
| 
| align=center| 2
| align=center| 5:00
| Yokohama, Kanagawa, Japan
|Lightweight (160 lb) bout.
|-
| Loss
| align=center| 10–4
| Phil Norman
| Decision (unanimous)
|Cage Rage 17
| 
| align=center| 3
| align=center| 5:00
| London, England
|
|-
| Win
| align=center| 10–3
| Steve Dawson
| KO (punches)
| CWFC: Strike Force 5
| 
| align=center| 1
| align=center| 0:50
| Coventry, England
|
|-
| Win
| align=center| 9–3
| Josenildo Ramarho
| Submission (rear-naked choke)
| CWFC: Strike Force 3
| 
| align=center| 1
| align=center| 4:52
| Coventry, England
|
|-
| Loss
| align=center| 8–3
| Shiko Yamashita
| Decision (majority)
| Shooto: 4/23 in Hakata Star Lanes
| 
| align=center| 3
| align=center| 5:00
| Hakata, Fukuoka, Japan
|
|-
| Win
| align=center| 8–2
| Patrick Vallee
| Submission (armbar)
| Shooto Sweden: Second Impact
| 
| align=center| 1
| align=center| 3:30
| Stockholm, Sweden
| Won Shooto Sweden Welterweight Championship
|-
| Win
| align=center| 7–2
| Tom Haddock
| KO
| Fight Night 2
| 
| align=center| 1
| align=center| 1:42
| Belfast, Northern Ireland
|
|-
| Win
| align=center| 6–2
| Valdas Pocevicius
| Decision
| Shooto Sweden: Initial Collision
| 
| align=center| 3
| align=center| 5:00
| Stockholm, Sweden
|
|-
| Loss
| align=center| 5–2
| Ryuta Sakurai
| Decision (unanimous)
| Shooto: 7/16 in Korakuen Hall
| 
| align=center| 3
| align=center| 5:00
| Tokyo, Japan
|
|-
| Win
| align=center| 5–1
| Sigitas Antanavicius
| TKO (punches)
| Shooto Finland: Capital Punishment 2
| 
| align=center| 1
| align=center| 1:57
| Helsinki, Finland
|
|-
| Win
| align=center| 4–1
| Charles McCarthy
| TKO (submission to punches)
| Absolute Fighting Championships 7
| 
| align=center| 1
| align=center| 3:33
| Ft. Lauderdale, Florida, United States
|
|-
| Win
| align=center| 3–1
| Kimmo Nurkse
| Submission (choke)
| FinnFight 7
| 
| align=center| 1
| align=center| 1:58
| Turku, Finland
|
|-
| Win
| align=center| 2–1
| Joni Kyllonen
| Decision (unanimous)
| Shooto Finland: Capital Punishment
| 
| align=center| 2
| align=center| 5:00
| Helsinki, Finland
|
|-
| Win
| align=center| 1–1
| Kai Rintakorpi
| TKO (submission to punches)
| Shooto Finland: Cold War
| 
| align=center| 1
| align=center| 2:34
| Turku, Finland
|
|-
| Loss
| align=center| 0–1
| Arben Lafti
| Decision
| FinnFight 5
| 
| align=center| 2
| align=center| 5:00
| Turku, Finland
|

References

External links 
 
 

1979 births
Living people
Swedish male mixed martial artists
Lightweight mixed martial artists
Welterweight mixed martial artists
Mixed martial artists utilizing Muay Thai
Mixed martial artists utilizing Brazilian jiu-jitsu
Swedish practitioners of Brazilian jiu-jitsu
People awarded a black belt in Brazilian jiu-jitsu
Swedish Muay Thai practitioners
Sportspeople from Stockholm
Doping cases in mixed martial arts
Swedish sportspeople in doping cases
Ultimate Fighting Championship male fighters